This is a list of Spanish words that come from indigenous languages of the Americas. It is further divided into words that come from Arawakan, Aymara, Carib, Mayan, Nahuatl, Quechua, Taíno, Tarahumara, Tupi and uncertain (the word is known to be from the Americas, but the exact source language is unclear). Some of these words have alternate etymologies and may also appear on a list of Spanish words from a different language.

Alphabetic list

A
achira (Quechua)
aguacate (Nahuatl awakatl)
ajolote (Nahuatl axolotl)
alpaca (Quechua allpaqa)
amate (Nahuatl amatl)
anticucho (Quechua anti uchu)
atole (Nahuatl atolli)

B
barbacoa (Taino)
batata (Taíno)
bejuco (Taino)
biznaga
bohío (Taino)
Borike′n (Taino) name for Puerto Rico
boricua (Taino) inhabitants of Borike′n
borinqueño adaptation from the Taino word Boricua

C
cacahuate/cacahuete (Nahuatl kakawatl)
cacao (Nahuatl)
cacique (Taíno)
cacomistle, cacomiztle, cacomixtle (Nahuatl kakomixtli)
caimán (Taíno)
calato (Quechua)
calincha (Quechua qharincha)
calpulli (Nahuatl kalpulli)
camote (Nahuatl kamohtli)
cancha (Quechua kancha)
caníbal (Taíno)
canoa (Taíno)
cañihua (Quechua qañiwa)
caoba
capulín
caraota
Caribe (Taíno)
caribú
carioca
caraqueño
casava (Taíno)
catre
caucho (Quechua)
casabe, cazabe (Taíno)
casava (Taíno)
cayo (Taíno)
ceiba (Taíno)
chaco (Quechua chaku)
chacra (Quechua chakra)
champa (Quechua ch'ampa)
charqui (Quechua ch'arki)
chayote (Nahuatl chayotl)
Chía (Quechua)
chicle (Nahuatl tsikitl)
chilacayote (Nahuatl)
chile, chili (Nahuatl chilli)
chinchilla (Aymara)
chirimoya (Quechua chiri muya)
choclo (Quechua chuqllu)
chocolate (Nahuatl xokolatl)
choro (Quechua ch'uru)
coca (Quechua kuka)
condor (Quechua kuntur)
concho (qunchu)
coronta (Quechua q'urunta)
coquí (Taíno)
coyote (Nahuatl koyotl)
curaca (Quechua kuraka)
cuate  (Nahuatl koatl)
Cuba (Taíno)
Cangil (Quechua  kankil )

E
ejote  (Nahuatl exotl)
elote (Nahuatl elotl)

H
Haití (Taíno)
hamaca
henequén
hicaco
huaca (Quechua)
huaco (Quechua)
huaraca (Quechua warak’a)
huayco (Quechua)
hule
huracán (Taíno)

I
iguana (Taíno)
inca (Quechua inka)
ixtle (Nahuatl)

J
jacal
jaguar (Guaraní)
Jamaica (Taíno)
jíbaro
jícama (Nahuatl xikámatl)
jícara
jitomate
jobo

L
llama (Quechua)
lempira
loro

M
mabí, maví (Taíno)
macana
macanudo
maguey (Taíno)
maiz (Taíno)
mamey (Taíno)
manatí (Taíno)
mandioca (Nheengatu/Guaraní manio'k / mandio)
mangle (Taíno)
maní
mapache (Nahuatl mapachtli)
maraca
maracuyá
mate ('drink')
maya
mecate (Nahuatl mekatl)
mesquite  (Nāhuatl mizquitl)
mico (Cumanagoto language)
milpa (Nahuatl milpan)
mixteco (Nahuatl mixtekatl)
mole ('sauce', Nahuatl molli)
morocho (Quechua )

N
náhuatl
nana (Quechua ñaña')
nigua
nopal (Nahuatl nopalli)

Ñ
ñandú
ñapa, yapa (Quechua)

O
ocelote (Nahuatl ocelotl)
ocote (Nahuatl okotl)
ojota (Quechua ushuta)
olmeca (Nahuatl olmekatl)

P
palta (Quechua)
pampa (Quechua)
papa (Quechua)
papaya (Taíno)
pécari
petaca
petate
pinole
pita (Quechua)
popote (Nahuatl, popotl)
poroto (Quechua purutu)
poto (Quechua putu)
pozole (Nahuatl, pozolli)
pulque (Classical Nahuatl poliuhqui octli)
puma (Quechua puma)
pupo (Quechua pupu)

Q
quechua (Quechua qhichwa)
quena (Quechua)
quetzal (Nahuatl)
quiltro
quincha (Quechua qincha)
quina (Quechua kinakina)
quinua, quinoa (Quechua kinwa)
quipu (Quechua khipu)
quisqueyano

S
sabana (Taíno)
sonsote, cenzotle
soroche (Quechua suruchiq)

T
tacho (Quechua tachu)
tamal (Nahuatl tamalli)
tamandua
tambo (Quechua tampu)
tapioca
tarahumara
tepehuán (Nahuatl Tēpēhuanih, Tepēhuāntin, Tēpēhuanitlahtōlli, and/or Tepēhuahcān)
tequila (Tecuilah)
tiburón (Taíno)
tiza  (Nahuatl, tizatl)
tomate (Nahuatl tómatl)
tucán
tuna
tuza (Nahuatl)

V
vicuña (Quechua wik'uña)
vizcacha (Quechua wisk'acha)

W
wincha (Quechua wincha)

Y
yuca
yuyo (Quechua yuyu)

Z
zacate (Nahuatl )
zapallo (Quechua )
zapote (Nahuatl )
zapoteca (Nahuatl )
zopilote (Nahuatl )

List by language of origin

Arawakan

Iguana
Cocoa
Barbecue
Hurricane
Hammock
Savannah
Tobacco
Papaya
Canoe
Potato
Jamaica
Guava

Aymara
china= feminine form of chino, see chino''' below
chino= a person indigenous to the Americas, a mestizo, a servant: from Aymara (or Quechua) china "female animal, servant"

Carib

arepa = a typical maize bread ; a pancake, a thin cake, fried or roasted made of maize flour (from Carib arepa)
canoa = a typical dugout canoe made by the native Amerindians (from Carib kanawa)
curiara = a typical dugout canoe made by the native Amerindians (from Carib kurijara)

Mayan
chuco = adv (comp)

Nahuatl

Quechua
Quechuan /ˈkɛtʃwən/, also known as runa simi ("people's language"), is a Native South American language family spoken primarily in the Andes, derived from a common ancestral language. It is the most widely spoken language family of the indigenous peoples of the Americas, with a total of probably some 8 million to 10 million speakers

Taíno
canoa = a typical dugout canoe made by the native Amerindians (from Taíno )

Tarahumara

Tupi–Guarani languages
 Guarani language: ñandú, ananá, guaraná, tatú, cajú, yacaré.
 Nheengatu language: tapioca (< typyʼók-a), jaguar (< jawár-a), mandioca (< maniʼók-a), tucán (< tukán-a) o tapir (< tapiʼír-a'').

Yaqui
buqui = boy/child
bichi = nude

See also

List of Spanish words of Nahuatl origin
List of English words of Spanish origin
Linguistic history of Spanish

References

"Breve diccionario etimológico de la lengua española" by Guido Gómez de Silva

American Indianst
Spanish